The 2017 New Democratic Party leadership election was won by Jagmeet Singh. The election was triggered by Tom Mulcair having lost a vote on leadership review at the party's federal convention held in Edmonton, Alberta, on April 10, 2016, which resulted in a majority of delegates voting in favor of holding a new leadership election. Mulcair declined to partake in the subsequent leadership election and stated that he would remain leader until the party chose a replacement.

Four candidates were on the leadership ballot: Charlie Angus, Niki Ashton, Guy Caron, and Jagmeet Singh. The voting process occurred on Sunday, October 1, 2017. Every party member was entitled to cast a secret vote using a preferential ranked ballot and exhaustive voting for the leadership election, allowing each member to choose one format or the other for their vote. Had no candidate received a majority during the first round of voting, subsequent rounds, occurring once a week, would have taken place until October 15, 2017, or until a candidate received a majority of votes.

Singh, the only non-MP in the race, formally announced his candidacy for the leadership on May 15, 2017. Singh received the support of 11 MPs, the most of any candidate, including former leadership candidates Nathan Cullen and Peter Julian, in addition to the support of major labour unions such as the United Food and Commercial Workers. Media attention surrounding his campaign noted the fact that, if elected, Singh would be the first visible minority person to lead a major federal party, as well as the first of the Sikh faith.

Singh was elected in the first round, with 53.8% of the votes, thus rendering the need for subsequent rounds of voting unnecessary. Following his election as Leader, Singh appointed former leadership rival Guy Caron to serve as the New Democratic Party's Parliamentary Leader.

Background
The result at the 2016 convention was the first time a leader of any Canadian federal political party has failed to receive at least 50% in a leadership review vote. In the months since the 2015 federal election, Mulcair's leadership had been a point of conflict within the party because of the election campaign, in which the NDP fell to third place from the Official Opposition status it gained in the 2011 election. The New Democrats had led public opinion polls since May 2015 and appeared to be poised to win their first federal election in history. However, they fell back behind the Liberals and Conservatives in the last month. The election thus resulted in a Liberal majority government.

The party lost more than half of its seats and fell to third place. Mulcair's leadership faced criticism following the election, particularly due to his moderate platform that the party was running on. In contrast, Liberal leader Justin Trudeau had promised to run a budget deficit to fund stimulus programs and higher social spending, a position which was perceived as the Liberals outflanking the NDP on the left.

Election rules
Under rules set out in the party's constitution, every member is entitled to cast a secret ballot for the selection of the Leader. The new leader was chosen on October 1, 2017, on the first round of voting through a preferential, ranked choice ballot that would have taken place once a week until a candidate hit the 50 per cent plus one mark to be declared leader had a leader not been chosen in the first round (with eligible voters choosing to vote with an internet ballot being allowed to change their vote at any time before the closure of the polls, including between each round of
balloting).

Candidates were required to pay an entry fee of $30,000 and spend no more than $1.5 million. 25% of all donations to candidates were paid to the party. To be nominated, candidates required at least 500 signatures from party members, at least half of which must be from female-identified members and at least 100 from "other equity-seeking groups" including indigenous people, LGBT people, persons with disabilities and visible minorities. At least 50 signatures were required from each of five regions: the Atlantic, Quebec, Ontario, the Prairies and B.C., and the North.

Timeline

Debates

Official candidates

Charlie Angus

Background
Charlie Angus, has been the MP for Timmins—James Bay since 2004 and was elected NDP Caucus Chair in January 2016. He is the author of seven books and worked as a journalist, a roofer and a dishwasher earlier in life. Before entering politics, Angus was a member of the Toronto punk band L'Étranger with Andrew Cash and Peter Duffin, from 1980 to circa 1984, and subsequently formed the country band Grievous Angels in 1986. From 1985 to 1990, Angus and his partner Brit Griffin lived in Angelus House, a Catholic Worker house they founded, where they invited the homeless to live with them. They also established a separate homeless shelter in 1986. In 1990, they moved to northern Ontario, where Angus owned and ran a magazine and eventually entered politics. Angus stepped down as Caucus Chair and Indigenous Affairs Critic on November 23, 2016, to consider a leadership bid. He formally registered his campaign with Elections Canada on February 20, 2017, and publicly launched it on February 26.
Date candidacy registered: February 20, 2017
Date campaign launched: February 26, 2017
Campaign website: 

Endorsements
 MPs: (2) Carol Hughes (Algoma—Manitoulin—Kapuskasing), Christine Moore (Abitibi—Témiscamingue)
 Provincial politicians: (8) Gilles Bisson (Ontario MPP for Timmins—James Bay), France Gélinas (Ontario MPP for Nickel Belt), Elizabeth Hanson (Yukon NDP leader; Yukon MLA for Whitehorse Centre), Andrew Swan (Manitoba MLA for Minto), John Vanthof (Ontario MPP for Timiskaming—Cochrane), Dave Wilson (Nova Scotia MLA for Sackville-Cobequid), Lenore Zann (Nova Scotia MLA for Truro-Bible Hill-Millbrook-Salmon River), Buckley Belanger (Saskatchewan MLA for Athabasca)
 Municipal politicians: (7) Phil Allt (City of Guelph Councillor for Ward 3), James Gordon (City of Guelph Councillor for Ward 2), Catherine McKenney (City of Ottawa Councillor for Somerset Ward), Gavin Will (Deputy Mayor of Portugal Cove-St. Philip's, Newfoundland and Labrador), Dustin Ross Fiddler (Band Councillor, Waterhen Lake First Nation), Alex Felsky (Grand Erie District School Board Trustee for Brantford), Leigh Bursey (Brockville, Ontario city councillor) 
 Former MPs: (15) Charmaine Borg (Terrebonne—Blainville, 2011–2015), Andrew Cash (Davenport, 2011–2015), Ray Funk (Prince Albert—Churchill River, 1988–1993), Claude Gravelle (Nickel Belt, 2008–2015), Matthew Kellway (Beaches—East York, 2011–2015), Wayne Marston (Hamilton East—Stoney Creek, 2006–2015), Pat Martin (Winnipeg Centre, 1997–2015), Jamie Nicholls (Vaudreuil-Soulanges, 2011–2015), Malcolm Allen (Welland, 2008–2015), Catherine Bell (Vancouver Island North, 2006–2008), Djaouida Sellah (Saint-Bruno—Saint-Hubert, 2011–2015), Mike Sullivan (York South—Weston, 2011–2015), Rod Murphy (Churchill, 1979–1993), Libby Davies (Vancouver East, 1997–2015), Tony Martin (Sault Ste. Marie, 2004–2011)
 Former provincial politicians: (8) Robin Austin (British Columbia MLA for Skeena, 2005–2017), Evelyn Gillespie (British Columbia MLA for Comox Valley, 1996–2001), Jennifer Howard (Manitoba MLA for Fort Rouge, 2007–2016), Eugene Kostyra (Manitoba MLA for Seven Oaks, 1981–1988), Ray Martin (Former Alberta NDP leader), Mat Whynott (Nova Scotia MLA for Hammonds Plains-Upper Sackville, 2009–2013), Becky Barrett (Manitoba Minister of Labour and Immigration, 1999–2003), Frank Corbett (Nova Scotia MLA for Cape Breton Centre, 1998–2015)
 Other prominent individuals: (10) Robyn Benson (President, Public Service Alliance of Canada), Dave Bidini (Musician), Michael Byers (Academic), Torquil Campbell (Musician), Darlene Dziewit (President, Manitoba Federation of Labour, 2004–2009), Ken Georgetti (President, Canadian Labour Congress, 1999–2014), Yann Martel (Author), Paul Moist (President, CUPE, 2003–2015), Mary Shortall (President, Newfoundland and Labrador Federation of Labour), Pat Stogran (former leadership candidate, former veterans' ombudsman), David Suzuki (Environmentalist), Bill Tieleman (Columnist, The Tyee), Glen Hare, Deputy Grand Chief of the Anishinabek Nation.
 Trade Unions and other organizations: (2) Public Service Alliance of Canada, Unifor Local 103
 Media:

Other information: Has emphasized job security, the high cost of post-secondary education and Indigenous issues. Angus is not as fluent in French as some of the other candidates but is said to have a good basis in the language.

Niki Ashton

Background
Niki Ashton, has been the MP for Churchill—Keewatinook Aski since 2015 and was previously the MP for Churchill (2008–2015). She served as NDP Critic for Jobs, Employment & Workforce Development Critic (2015–2017), Shadow Minister for Status of Women (2012–2015) and Aboriginal Affairs (2015). She placed seventh in the 2012 leadership race. She is the daughter of former Manitoba NDP MLA Steve Ashton, who served as a minister in the cabinets of Gary Doer and Greg Selinger.
Date candidacy registered: March 2, 2017
Date campaign launched: March 7, 2017
Campaign website: 
-
Endorsements
 MPs: (5) Sheri Benson (Saskatoon West), François Choquette (Drummond), Georgina Jolibois (Desnethé—Missinippi—Churchill River), Romeo Saganash (Abitibi—Baie-James—Nunavik—Eeyou), Brigitte Sansoucy (Saint-Hyacinthe—Bagot)
 Provincial politicians: (4) Cheri DiNovo (Ontario MPP for Parkdale—High Park; withdrawn leadership candidate), Tom Lindsey (Manitoba MLA for Flin Flon), Flor Marcelino (Interim Manitoba NDP leader; Manitoba MLA for Logan), Doug Routley (BC MLA for Nanaimo-North Cowichan)
 Municipal politicians: (5) Jason Blackman-Wulff (District of Squamish Councillor), Sue Powell (City of Parksville Councillor), Craig Sauvé (City of Montreal Councillor for Saint-Henri—Little-Burgundy—Pointe-Saint-Charles), Katherine Swampy (Samson Cree Nation Band Councillor), Ross Sutherland (South Frontenac, Ontario councillor)
 Former MPs: (6) Paulina Ayala (Honoré-Mercier, 2011–2015), Joe Comartin (Windsor—St. Clair, 2000–2004; Windsor—Tecumseh, 2004–2015), Raymond Côté (Beauport—Limoilou, 2011–2015), John Parry (Kenora—Rainy River, 1984–1988), Dennis Bevington (Northwest Territories, 2006–2015), Alex Atamanenko (British Columbia Southern Interior), 2006–2015
 Former provincial politicians: (1) Steve Ashton (Manitoba MLA for Thompson, 1981–2016)
 Other prominent individuals: (4) Fred Hahn (President, CUPE Ontario), Tarek Loubani (Activist), Anne Roberts (City of Vancouver Councillor, 2002–2005), Sid Ryan (President, Ontario Federation of Labour, 2009–2015)
 Trade Unions and other organizations: (3) Canadians for Justice and Peace in the Middle East, Fightback Canada, NDP Socialist Caucus
 Media:

Other information:
 Planned to create and maintain good-paying jobs for young people and working Canadians, and tackling the threat of climate change.
 Committed to providing tuition-free post-secondary education.
 Advocates combatting the unequal distribution of wealth, the loss of value-added jobs, the "foreign ownership and trade deals that are selling us out".

Guy Caron

Background
Guy Caron, has been the MP for Rimouski-Neigette—Témiscouata—Les Basques since 2011, NDP Finance Critic (2015–2017), Quebec caucus chair (2011–2017), Shadow Minister for Natural Resources, and Shadow Minister for Industry (2011–2012). Caron resigned as NDP Finance Critic and Quebec caucus chair on February 12, 2017, to prepare to enter the leadership contest. He announced his candidacy on February 27, 2017.
Date candidacy registered: February 27, 2017
Date campaign launched: February 27, 2017
Campaign website: 

Endorsements
 MPs: (8) Robert Aubin (Trois-Rivières), Ruth Ellen Brosseau (Berthier—Maskinongé), Anne Minh-Thu Quach (Salaberry—Suroît), Karine Trudel (Jonquière), Scott Duvall (Hamilton Mountain), Don Davies (Vancouver Kingsway), Fin Donnelly (Port Moody—Coquitlam), Pierre Nantel (Longueuil—Saint-Hubert).
 Provincial politicians: (2) Peter Tabuns (Ontario MPP for Toronto—Danforth) Lorraine Michael (Newfoundland and Labrador MHA for St. John's East-Quidi Vidi, former provincial leader.)
 Municipal politicians: (1) Alex Johnstone (Hamilton-Wentworth District School Board trustee for Wards 11 and 12)
 Former MPs: (9) Chris Charlton (Hamilton Mountain, 2006–2015), Jean Crowder (Nanaimo—Cowichan, 2004–2015), Rosane Doré Lefebvre (Alfred-Pellan, 2011–2015), Yvon Godin (Acadie—Bathurst, 1997–2015), Alexa McDonough (Halifax, 1997–2008; federal NDP leader, 1995–2003; Nova Scotia NDP leader, 1980–1994), Lorne Nystrom (Yorkton—Melville, 1968–1993; Regina—Qu'Appelle, 1997–2004), Craig Scott (Toronto—Danforth, 2012–2015), Judy Wasylycia-Leis (Winnipeg North, 1997–2010), Denise Savoie (Victoria, 2006–2012)
 Former provincial politicians: (8) Alex Cullen (Ontario MPP for Ottawa West, 1997–1999), Howard Hampton (Ontario NDP leader, 1996–2009; Ontario MPP for Rainy River, 1987–1999; Ontario MPP for Kenora—Rainy River, 1999–2011), Shelley Martel (Ontario MPP for Sudbury East, 1987–1999; Ontario MPP for Nickel Belt, 1999–2007), Theresa Oswald (Manitoba MLA for Seine River, 2003–2016), Erin Selby (Manitoba MLA for Southdale, 2007–2016), Stan Struthers (Manitoba MLA for Dauphin, 1995–1999 and 2011–2016; Manitoba MLA for Dauphin—Roblin, 1999–2011), Pat Atkinson (Saskatchewan MLA for Saskatoon Nutana, 1986–2011), Ron Lemieux (Manitoba MLA for Dawson Trail, 2011–2016 and for La Verendrye, 1999–2011)
 Other prominent individuals: (4) Victor Lau (Green Party of Saskatchewan leader, 2011–2016), Lia Storey-Gamble (Co-chair, New Democratic Youth of Canada), Janet Solberg (Vice President, Ontario New Democratic Party, daughter of the second leader (1971–1975) of the federal NDP, David Lewis), Brian Topp (former President of the NDP, runner up for leader in 2012)
 Trade Unions and other organizations: (2) United Steelworkers, UBC NDP
 Media:

Other information:
 Promised to address income inequity by introducing a guaranteed basic income for Canadians.
 Campaigned on climate change as his second major plank.

Jagmeet Singh

Background
Jagmeet Singh, 38, was the Ontario MPP for Bramalea—Gore—Malton (2011–2017) and was Deputy Leader of the Ontario New Democratic Party from 2015 until entering the federal leadership contest on May 15, 2017. He was previously the federal NDP candidate in Bramalea—Gore—Malton in 2011.
Date candidacy registered: May 18, 2017
Date campaign launched: May 15, 2017
Campaign website: jagmeetsingh.ca

Endorsements

 MPs: (11) Rachel Blaney (North Island—Powell River), Nathan Cullen (Skeena—Bulkley Valley), Randall Garrison (Esquimalt—Saanich—Sooke), Peter Julian (New Westminster—Burnaby), Jenny Kwan (Vancouver East), Hélène Laverdière (Laurier—Sainte-Marie), Alistair MacGregor (Cowichan—Malahat—Langford), Sheila Malcolmson (Nanaimo—Ladysmith), Brian Masse (Windsor West), Tracey Ramsey (Essex), Kennedy Stewart (Burnaby South),
 Provincial politicians: (19) Harry Bains (British Columbia MLA for Surrey-Newton; Minister of Labour), Judy Darcy (British Columbia MLA for New Westminster; Minister of Mental Health and Addictions), Catherine Fife (Ontario MPP for Kitchener—Waterloo), Rob Fleming (British Columbia MLA for Victoria-Swan Lake; Minister of Education), Nahanni Fontaine (Manitoba MLA for St. Johns), Cindy Forster (Ontario MPP for Welland), Jennifer French (Ontario MPP for Oshawa), Wayne Gates (Ontario MPP for Niagara Falls), Lisa Gretzky (Ontario MPP for Windsor West), Percy Hatfield (Ontario MPP for Windsor—Tecumseh), Ravi Kahlon (British Columbia MLA for Delta North), Anne Kang (British Columbia MLA for Burnaby-Deer Lake), Wab Kinew (Leader of the Manitoba NDP; MLA for Fort Rouge), Michael Mantha (Ontario MPP for Algoma—Manitoulin), Taras Natyshak (Ontario MPP for Essex), Lana Popham (British Columbia MLA for Saanich South; Minister of Agriculture), Bruce Ralston (British Columbia MLA for Surrey-Whalley; Minister of Jobs, Trade, and Technology), Peggy Sattler (Ontario MPP for London West), Rachna Singh (British Columbia MLA for Surrey-Green Timbers)
 Municipal politicians: (11) Maria Augimeri (Toronto Councillor for Ward 9), Joe Cressy (Toronto Councillor for Ward 20), Sarah Doucette (Toronto Councillor for Ward 13), Paula Fletcher (Toronto Councillor for Ward 30), Matthew Green (City of Hamilton Councillor for Ward 3), Joe Mihevc (Toronto Councillor for Ward 21), Chris Moise (Toronto District School Board trustee for Ward 14; TDSB vice-chair), Gord Perks (Toronto Councillor for Ward 14), Anthony Perruzza (Toronto Councillor for Ward 8), Neethan Shan (City of Toronto Councillor for Ward 42), Harkirat Singh (Peel District School Board trustee for Brampton Wards 9 and 10)
 Former MPs: (1) Mylène Freeman (Argenteuil—Papineau—Mirabel, 2011–2015)
 Former provincial politicians: (3) Rosario Marchese (Ontario MPP for Fort York, 1990–1999; Ontario MPP for Trinity—Spadina, 1999–2014), Jonah Schein (Ontario MPP for Davenport, 2011–2014), Jane Shin (British Columbia MLA for Burnaby-Lougheed, 2013–2017)
 Other prominent individuals: (6) Ali Chatur (Co-chair, New Democratic Youth of Canada), Tanmanjeet Dhesi (United Kingdom MP for Slough), Fateh (Rapper), Rupi Kaur (Poet), Brad Lavigne (former NDP National Campaign Director), Scott Stager Piatkowski (Vice President, Ontario NDP)
 Trade Unions and other organizations: (3) United Food and Commercial Workers, International Association of Machinists and Aerospace Workers CUPE Local 79
 Media: Toronto Star
Other information
 Singh's election made him the first visible minority person to lead a major federal party, as well as the first of the Sikh faith.
 The four core focuses of Singh's campaign were inequality, climate change, reconciliation with indigenous peoples, and electoral reform.
 Singh has stated his preference for ending the War on Drugs by pursuing the Portuguese model of decriminalising personal possession of all narcotics and instead promoting harm reduction for users.

Withdrawn candidates

Cheri DiNovo

Background
Cheri DiNovo, 65, is the Ontario MPP for Parkdale—High Park (2006–present) and since 2014 has served as the Ontario NDP critic for Urban Transportation, Greater Toronto Area Issues, and LGBTQ Issues.

Date candidacy announced: June 7, 2016 ("unofficial"); June 13, 2016 (official).
Date withdrawn: August 2, 2016
Subsequently endorsed: Niki Ashton

Other information: DiNovo originally was running as an "unofficial candidate" in protest of the party's $30,000 entry fee, but on June 13, 2016, she announced that her candidacy would be moving from unofficial status to official status, stating that her campaign will begin fundraising when the leadership election rules are finalized in July 2016. She was running to support democratic socialist principles and "to fight for principles rather than for a position". Four main policy planks were: An "aggressive and realistic response to the climate crisis" including the banning of nuclear power and opposition to pipelines; "social justice and human rights" including a ban on conversion therapy and a plan to increase unionization rates; "an end to systemic racism" around indigenous issues, support for Black Lives Matter; "truly universal and free" post-secondary education, dental care and pharmacare and "livable" social assistance rates. DiNovo announced on August 2, 2016, that she would no longer be a candidate due to health reasons, having recently suffered two small strokes.

Peter Julian

Background

Peter Julian, is the MP for New Westminster—Burnaby (2015–present) and was previously the MP for Burnaby—New Westminster (2004–2015). From 2014 to 2016, Julian was the NDP's house leader. He is the NDP's former Shadow Minister for Natural Resources and Energy (2012–2014), Finance (2011–2012) and Industry (2011) and has also served as NDP Caucus Chair (2011–2014). Before entering politics he was the executive director of the Council of Canadians. He resigned as NDP House Leader on October 19, 2016, to consider his candidacy. He officially registered his candidacy on December 21, 2016, and formally launched his campaign on February 12, 2017.
Date candidacy registered: December 21, 2016
Date campaign launched: February 12, 2017
Date withdrawn: July 6, 2017
Subsequently endorsed: Jagmeet Singh
Campaign website: 

Endorsements
 MPs: (6) Robert Aubin (Trois-Rivières), Alexandre Boulerice (Rosemont—La Petite-Patrie), François Choquette (Drummond), Pierre-Luc Dusseault (Sherbrooke), Brigitte Sansoucy (Saint-Hyacinthe—Bagot), Erin Weir (Regina—Lewvan)
 Provincial politicians: (1) Raj Chouhan (British Columbia MLA for Burnaby-Edmonds)
 Former MPs: (6) Paulina Ayala (Honoré-Mercier, 2011–2015), Sylvain Chicoine (Châteauguay—Saint-Constant, 2011–2015), Pierre Dionne Labelle (Rivière-du-Nord, 2011–2015), Alain Giguère (Marc-Aurèle-Fortin, 2011–2015), Sadia Groguhé (Saint-Lambert, 2011–2015), Djaouida Sellah (Saint-Bruno—Saint-Hubert, 2011–2015)
Other information
 Opposes growing inequality and favours affordable housing, would eliminate overseas tax havens and tax breaks for "the one percent". Advocates free tuition for post-secondary education and action on climate change and indigenous issues, has opposed pipeline development.
 Withdrew due to poor fundraising results.

Pat Stogran

Background

Pat Stogran, is the former Veteran's Ombudsman (2007–2010) and a retired Colonel of the Canadian Forces (Princess Patricia's Canadian Light Infantry). Stogran studied engineering at Royal Roads Military College in Colwood, British Columbia, and holds a master's degree in strategic studies from the United States Army War College. He served with the military in both Bosnia and Afghanistan.
Date candidacy registered: April 17, 2017
Date campaign launched: April 20, 2017
Date withdrawn: June 3, 2017
Subsequently endorsed: Charlie Angus
Campaign website:  [broken link]

Endorsements
 Former MPs: (1) Inky Mark (variously Reform/Progressive Conservative/Canadian Alliance/Conservative MP for Dauphin—Swan River 1997–2004, Conservative Dauphin—Swan River—Marquette 2004–2010)
Other information: Withdrew after complaining the party had put "major obstacles" in place making it difficult for candidates to grow the party's base.

Failed to qualify
Candidates who declared their candidacies but were unable to complete the process of submitting their nomination forms and deposits to the party by the deadline of July 3, 2017:

David Berlin

Background

David Berlin, 66, is the former editor and owner of the Literary Review of Canada and was the co-founder of the general interest magazine, The Walrus, as well as its editor from 2003 to 2004. He was the federal NDP's candidate in Toronto Centre in the 2000 federal election and was founder and leader of The Bridge Party of Canada, running as its candidate in University—Rosedale in the 2015 federal election. Declared candidacy and passed vetting by party but failed to submit deposit and/or sufficient nomination signatures by deadline.
Date candidacy registered: 
Date campaign launched: June 19, 2017

Ibrahim Bruno El-Khoury

Background

El-Khoury was born in Beirut, Lebanon but moved to Kingston, Ontario in 1991.  He is a former Montreal municipal candidate (2013) who is the founder of a consulting firm in Montreal. He ran for the NDP nomination in Papineau in the 2015 election, losing to Anne Lagacé Dowson, and was a city council candidate for centrist municipal party Vrai changement pour Montréal in 2013. Registered with Elections Canada but failed to submit deposit and/or sufficient nomination signatures by deadline.
Date candidacy registered: March 27, 2017

Brian Graff

Graff is a 58-year-old former Toronto municipal candidate (2014), community activist, and semi-retired financial analyst. Graff's application to run was rejected twice by NDP officials. He claimed it was because of his policy to cut immigration, while the party said it was on the grounds that he does not support party policy, as well as due to a 1993 charge for watching and besetting, which resulted in a conditional discharge. Graff took the NDP to court in March through a "judicial review" on the grounds that the party had violated natural justice, and this resulted in a settlement allowing him to apply a second time. After the party's second rejection, Graff returned to court with a second judicial review in an attempt to require the NDP to permit him to run. The party argued it was not subject to judicial review. On June 9, 2017, the court ruled that the NDP and other political parties are subject to judicial review, but that the party's actions were not unreasonable in rejecting Graff's application to stand for leader.

Declined
 Karl Bélanger – National Director of the NDP (2016), Principal Secretary to NDP Leader Tom Mulcair (2012–2016), Senior Press Secretary to NDP Leader Jack Layton (2003–2011)
 Cindy Blackstock – executive director of First Nations Child and Family Caring Society of Canada.
 Daniel Blaikie, MP for Elmwood—Transcona (2015–present).
 Rebecca Blaikie, President of the NDP (2011–2016), Treasurer of the NDP (2009–2011).
 Robert Chisholm, MP for Dartmouth—Cole Harbour (2011–2015), Leader of the Nova Scotia New Democratic Party (1996–2000), Leader of the Opposition in Nova Scotia (1998–1999). Ran in the 2012 leadership race though withdrew before the vote.
 Alexandre Boulerice – MP for Rosemont—La Petite-Patrie (2011–present) and NDP Quebec lieutenant. Endorsed Julian before his withdrawal.
 Ruth Ellen Brosseau – MP for Berthier—Maskinongé (2011–present). Endorsed Caron.
 Olivia Chow – MP for Trinity—Spadina (2006–2014), widow of former leader Jack Layton. Placed third in the 2014 Toronto mayoral election.
 Nathan Cullen – MP for Skeena—Bulkley Valley (2004–present). Placed third in the 2012 leadership race.
 Paul Dewar – MP for Ottawa Centre (2006–2015). Placed fifth in the 2012 leadership race.
 Gary Doer — Canadian Ambassador to the United States (2009–2016), Premier of Manitoba (1999–2009), Leader of the Manitoba New Democratic Party (1988–2009), Manitoba MLA for Concordia (1986–2009).
 Howard Hampton, Leader of the Ontario New Democratic Party (1996–2009), Attorney General of Ontario (1990–1993), Ontario Minister of Natural Resources and Minister Responsible for Native Affairs (both 1993–1995), Ontario MPP for Rainy River (1987–1999) and Kenora—Rainy River (1999–2011). Endorsed Caron. 
 Wab Kinew — Manitoba NDP MLA, former CBC broadcaster, Leader of the Manitoba NDP following the 2017 leadership of Manitoba NDP. Endorsed Singh.
 Naomi Klein – author, journalist, and documentary filmmaker. Co-author of the Leap Manifesto.
 Mike Layton, Toronto City Councillor (2010–present), son of former leader Jack Layton
 Megan Leslie – MP for Halifax (2008–2015) and NDP deputy leader (2012–2015).
 Avi Lewis – documentary filmmaker, broadcaster, and co-author of the Leap Manifesto, son of former Ontario NDP leader Stephen Lewis and grandson of former federal NDP leader David Lewis.
 Anne McGrath – Deputy Chief of Staff to Alberta Premier Rachel Notley (2015–present), National Director of the NDP (2014–2015), President of the NDP (2006–2009).
 Tom Mulcair – Leader of the Opposition (2012–2015), incumbent Leader of the NDP (2012–2017), MP for Outremont (2007–2018).
 Rachel Notley – Premier of Alberta (2015–2019), leader of the Alberta New Democratic Party (2014–present), Alberta MLA for Edmonton-Strathcona (2008–present).
 Sid Ryan – President of the Ontario Federation of Labour (2009-2015), President of CUPE Ontario (1992-2009), Ontario provincial NDP candidate in 1999 in Scarborough Centre, and in Oshawa in 2003 and 2007, and federal NDP candidate in Oshawa in 2004 and 2006. Endorsed Ashton.
 Romeo Saganash, MP for Abitibi—Baie-James—Nunavik—Eeyou (2011–present). Ran in the 2012 leadership race though withdrew before the vote. Endorsed Ashton.
 Peter Stoffer – MP for Sackville—Eastern Shore (2004–2015) and Sackville—Musquodoboit Valley—Eastern Shore (1997–2004).
 Brian Topp – Chief of Staff to Alberta Premier Rachel Notley (2015–present), President of the NDP (2011). Placed second in the 2012 leadership race. Endorsed Caron.
 Hassan Yussuff, President of the Canadian Labour Congress (2014–present).

Opinion polling
Some earlier polls include candidates who ultimately did not enter the race.

New Democratic Party members

New Democratic Party voters / supporters

All Canadians

Results

 Rejected ballots: 101
 Abstentions: 172
 Turnout: 52.8% (1.9pp)

Notes

References

2017
2017 elections in Canada
October 2017 events in Canada
New Democratic Party leadership election